Pierre-Alexandre Rousseau (born October 6, 1979, in Drummondville, Quebec) is a Canadian freestyle skier who currently resides in  Drummondville. Pierre-Alexandre Rousseau participates in the mogul discipline.

Rousseau has been part of two historic sweeps of the medal podiums on the 2008-09 FIS Freestyle Ski World Cup tour with Alexandre Bilodeau and Vincent Marquis. Pierre-Alexandre Rousseau was the world champion at the 2007 Freestyle Ski World Championships in the moguls event. Rousseau also achieved at silver in the moguls event of the 2001 World Championships at Blackcomb.

At the age of 30, Rousseau competed in his first Olympic Games at the 2010 Winter Olympics, placing fifth. Rousseau had previously missed the 2002 Winter Olympics because of a neck injury, and was left off the team in Turin.

References

External links
National Team Profile
CTV Olympic Profile

Canadian male freestyle skiers
Freestyle skiers at the 2010 Winter Olympics
Olympic freestyle skiers of Canada
Sportspeople from Drummondville
Living people
1979 births